The Presta valve (also French valve (FV) or Sclaverand valve) is a tire valve commonly found in high pressure road style and some mountain bicycle inner tubes. It comprises an outer valve stem and an inner valve body. A lock nut to secure the stem at the wheel rim and a valve cap may also be present.

Name
The  Sclaverand valve was invented by Frenchman Etienne Sclaverand and is often referred to as the French valve. Today it is also known as Presta valve. Presta or presto stands in the  Romance languages for "fast, hurry, immediately".

Description 
The outer valve stem is manufactured in various lengths for different applications and has a narrower diameter than Dunlop and Schrader valves.  The weakest point of a bicycle rim is usually the hole for the valve stem. The smaller hole for a Presta valve makes it possible to have extremely narrow wheels while maintaining sufficient strength in the wheel.

The air pressure in an inflated tire holds the inner valve body shut. A small screw and captive nut on the top of the valve body permits the valve to be screwed shut and ensure that it remains tightly closed.

The nut must be unscrewed to permit airflow in either direction. The screw remains captive on the valve body even when unscrewed fully; it is tightened again after the tire is inflated and the pump removed. The valve cap protects the valve body, keeps dirt and mud out of the mechanism, and also prevents the valve from damaging the tube when it is rolled for storage, but is not necessary to prevent pressure loss.

The holes in rims sized for Presta valves can be enlarged to accommodate the wider Schrader valves, which can structurally weaken the rim. Conversely, when a Presta valve is fitted into the larger Schrader rim hole, grommets or reducers are sometimes used to take up the extra space.

The standard Presta valve has an external thread. An adapter can be fitted onto this external thread to permit the Presta valve to be connected to a pump with a Schrader chuck. The same adapter, because of a coincidence of thread sizes, may be able to convert a Schrader pump into one that can connect to flexible adapters of either kind.

Removable valve cores 

Unlike Schrader valves, not all Presta valves have removable cores.

Presta valves with removable cores may be used with a tubeless setup to add sealant through the valve.  Sealant may also be added by pouring it directly into the tire.

Valve extenders 
Valve extenders can be used to lengthen shorter Presta valves to accommodate deeper and thicker rims, such as those on aerodynamic race wheels. There are two variants of valve extenders depending on whether the Presta core is removable.

Threading 
The valve threads for Presta valves follow the ISO 4570 standard. The external threads at the tip of both "threaded" and "unthreaded" Presta valves are 5V2 (#12-24TPI), which measures out to 5.2×1.058 mm, the same thread size as the tip of a Dunlop valve. The external threads on the main body of "threaded" Presta valves are 6V1, which measures 6×0.80 mm.

See also 
 Bicycle tire
 Inner tube
 Valve stem
 Schrader valve
 Dunlop valve

References 

Air valves
Tires
Bicycle parts
1897 introductions
French inventions